Hero Ignitor is a 125cc Naked motorcycle from Hero MotoCorp. It is a half fairing motorcycle.

References

Ignitor
Motorcycles introduced in 2012